Alba Bautista (born 13 July 2002) is a Spanish rhythmic gymnast. She won a bronze medal at the 2022 World Championships in the team category.

Personal life 
Bautista took up the sport at age six in Teruel. She was named the 2019 Female Athlete of the Year in Teruel, Spain, the ceremony took place in 2021.

Career

Junior 
Bautista won All-Around bronze at the 2017 Spanish national championships, as well as silver with ball and clubs and gold with ribbon. She got yet another bronze with her club in the Spanish club championships. Thanks to these results she was included in the national team.

Senior 
In 2018 Alba was selected to take part in the Gymnasiada, finishing 16th. Later winning bronze with ribbon at nationals. Bautista was also part of the rooster aiming to represent Spain at the 2018 World Championships, but she didn't make the team. In December she was confirmed as part of the national team and integrated in the team training at the "Centro Deportivo Colonial Sport" in Valencia.

Bautista started 2019 by competing in the Kyiv Grand-Prix, followed by the Baltic Hoop tournament where she was 19th. In May María Añó's injury made her eligible for her World Cup debut in Guadalajara. At nationals she won silver with ball. In September Bautista was confirmed in the national team.

In 2020 Alba was to participate in the Guadalajara Tournament and the Deriugina Cup, but the COVID-19 pandemic stalled the season. She returned to train in September as a temporary reserve for the national group. Alba also won All-Around's silver at the 2nd online trournament behind Dina Averina. In December she became national vice champion behind Polina Berezina.

The following year she won bronze at nationals and took part in the selection process for the Spanish team to compete at the 2021 World Championships, again not making the team.

2022 was Bautista breakthrough year, Alba participated in the first World Cup of the season in Athens finishing 16th in the All-Around. She then took part in the international tournament in Marbella, finishing again 16th. Alba replaced Teresa Gorospe in the World Cup stage of Sofia. She also participated in the World Cups in Pamplona and Pesaro. In late May she was selected for her first major international competition, the European Championships in Tel Aviv, Israel, along Polina Berezina, the two juniors Marina Cortelles and Victoria Correia and the senior group, Alba qualified for the All-Around final finishing 17th. The following month, at nationals she won the silver medal behind Berezina and ahead of Gorospe. Bautista then attended the last World Cup of the season in Cluj-Napoca, qualifying for the hoop and ribbon event finals. In September she was confirmed in the national team for 2022–2023, then she competed at the World Championships in Sofia, Bulgaria, along Berezina and the senior team, helping Spain win bronze in the team event, the first medal in this event since 1991. She also qualified for the All-Around, ball and ribbon finals, finishing 17th, 5th and 7th respectively.

In January 2023 Alba was selected for the national team's training camp in Gran Canaria along Patricia Pérez, Irene Martínez, Valeria Márquez, Inés Bergua, Mireia Martínez, Andrea Fernández, Nerea Moreno, Salma Solaun, Ana Arnau and individuals Polina Berezina, Lucía González and Teresa Golospe.

Routine music information

References

Living people
2002 births
Spanish rhythmic gymnasts
People from Teruel
Medalists at the Rhythmic Gymnastics World Championships